Muraena augusti is a moray eel found north of the eastern Central Atlantic ocean. It was described by Johann Jakob Kaup in 1856, originally under the genus Thyrsoidea.

References

External links
 

augusti
Taxa named by Johann Jakob Kaup
Fish described in 1856